San Pablo was an unincorporated community located in Maricopa County, Arizona, United States.  The San Pablo neighborhood was one of several Mexican colonias in the Salt River Valley around Phoenix, Arizona.  In the 1950s, Arizona State University used its power of eminent domain to redevelop San Pablo into dormitories, sports facilities and commercial infrastructure.

Geography
San Pablo was adjacent to Tempe, Arizona. The more eastern section was sometimes called the "Mickey Mouse Barrio."

Historic buildings and areas
 Mount Carmel Catholic Church

See also
 List of cities and towns in Arizona

References

Unincorporated communities in Maricopa County, Arizona